Albi De Abreu (born as Albino de Abreu Do Nascimiento on 31 May 1975) is a Venezuelan theater and television actor.

Biography
Albi began his television career at the age of 14 when he began appearing in several TV commercials. He got his first acting role in the telenovela Sol de Tentación in 1996. Thereafter, he portrayed leading roles in many Venezuelan telenovelas and TV Series. Shortly thereafter, Albi had the opportunity to show his acting skills in several features films and plays.

Being aware of the importance of being fully trained and prepared, Albi De Abreu put on hold his acting career, and spent two years improving his acting skills at The Sanford Meisner in Los Angeles City. Also he became a fluent English / Portuguese / Spanish speaker.

Besides his acting career, Albi De Abreu is being developing his skills as a director, movie writer, and documentary photographer. "Colmillo" (Fang) and "Musica Del Cielo" (Music from the Sky) are the two short films he had written and directed so far.

In 2012, he portrayed the villain in the Colombian TV Series Lynch.

Filmography

Film roles

Television roles

References

External links
 
 Albi De Abreu: Menos es más at 
 "Una zuliana me robó el corazón": Albi de Abreu at 

1975 births
Living people
Male actors from Caracas
Venezuelan male telenovela actors
Venezuelan male television actors
Venezuelan people of Portuguese descent